Petra Beáta Farkas (born 30 April 1999) is a Hungarian athlete specialising in the long jump. She represented her country at the 2019 World Championships in Doha without reaching the final. Earlier that year she won a silver medal at the European U23 Championships in Gävle.

Her personal bests in the event are 6.72 metres outdoors (+1.9 m/s, Budapest 2019) and 6.41 metres indoors (Budapest 2018).

International competitions

References

External links

1999 births
Living people
Hungarian female long jumpers
World Athletics Championships athletes for Hungary
European Games competitors for Hungary
Athletes (track and field) at the 2019 European Games
21st-century Hungarian women